The 1978 European Taekwondo Championships were held in Barcelona Spain between May 22 and 23, 1976 under the organization of the European Taekwondo Union (ETU) and the Spanish Federation of Taekwondo. The competition was held at the Palau Blaugrana.

Medal table

Medalist

References

External links 
 European Taekwondo Union

1976 in taekwondo
European Taekwondo Championships
International taekwondo competitions hosted by Spain
1976 in European sport
1976 in Spanish sport